St. Elizabeth's Retreat Chapel is a historic Catholic chapel at 2825 W. 32nd Avenue in Denver, Colorado, United States.  It was built in 1894 and was added to the National Register of Historic Places in 1976.

It was designed by architect Frederick G. Sterner and has an apsidal plan.

References

Churches in the Roman Catholic Archdiocese of Denver
National Register of Historic Places in Denver
Properties of religious function on the National Register of Historic Places in Colorado
Churches completed in 1894